Seán Armstrong (born 20 March 1986) is an Irish former Gaelic footballer from Galway. Armstrong played his club football with Salthill-Knocknacarra and inter-county football for Galway from 2005 to 2014 spending ten years as an inter-county footballer.

Career
Seán was a key part of Galway's Under 21 All-Ireland triumph of 2005. He formed a devastating partnership with Michael Meehan in the final as they scored 6-03 between them in a 6-05 to 4-06 victory over Down to claim the title. 

Armstrong announced his retirement from the inter-county scene on 17 December 2014 at the age of 28 citing a loss of his love of the game. he is also a teacher in St Mary's College

Honours
Salthill-Knocknacarra
Galway Senior Football Championship (2): 2005, 2012
Connacht Senior Club Football Championship (1): 2005
All-Ireland Senior Club Football Championship (1): 2006

Galway
Connacht Minor Football Championship (2): 2003, 2004
Connacht Under-21 Football Championship (1): 2005
All-Ireland Under-21 Football Championship (1): 2005
Connacht Senior Football Championship (3): 2005, 2008, 2018

Connacht
Railway Cup (1): 2014

References

External links

1986 births
Living people
People from Galway (city)
Salthill-Knocknacarra Gaelic footballers
Galway inter-county Gaelic footballers
Shannon RFC players
Rugby union players from County Galway